The Nickelodeon Kids' Choice Awards Colombia was the Colombian edition of Nickelodeon's Kids Choice Awards, held in Bogotá. In 2017 the awards took place on September 30th, nominees were announced on July 19, 2017.

Hosts

Editions 

Spanish-language editions of the Kids Choice Awards 2012-2013
In 2013, Nickelodeon held a new event, a Spanish version of the Kids’ Choice Awards in Mexico, which was viewable throughout greater Latin America. Depending on ratings, if the Mexican awards show met or exceeded network goals (which it was projected to), another Spanish-language Kids’ Choice Awards would subsequently be held in Colombia. This was also intended as an incentive to reward Colombia’s young students, if they performed well academically (on a national level) in the school year 2012-2013. Ultimately, the popular Colombian sitcom on Spanish-language Nickelodeon, Chica Vampiro, would go on to win Personality of the Year (Colombian) and Best Musical Artist (Colombian). Other nominees included a diverse range of celebrities, from Alkylados, Linda Palma, Diego Saenz, to 21 bedroom, among others. The big winners were the musical group Alkylados and Olympic medalist Mariana Pajón. Given the excellent rstings, the Colombian network confirmed the Kids’ Choice Awards Colombia a second time, on 30 August 2014.

2014 edition
After a small test vote in the Kids Choice Awards Mexico 2013 in which some great results, and thanks to the support of the Colombian series Chica Vampiro upfront Nickelodeon Latin America 2014 held in the city of Bogota was confirmed by first time the awards Kids Choice Awards in Colombia and it was announced that it would be in the city of Bogotá and the date is already confirmed for August 30, 2014 in Bogota, and the award is fully confirmed.

References

Awards established in 2014
Awards disestablished in 2017
Nickelodeon Kids' Choice Awards
2014 establishments in Colombia
Spanish-language Nickelodeon original programming